Augustamnica (Latin) or Augoustamnike (Greek) was a Roman province of Egypt created during the 5th century and was part of the Diocese of Oriens first and then of the Diocese of Egypt, until the Muslim conquest of Egypt in the 640s.

Some ancient episcopal sees of the province are included in the Catholic Church's list of titular sees.

Augustamnica 
The province was instituted in tetrarchic times under the name of Aegyptus Herculia (for Diocletian's colleague Maximian), with ancient Memphis as capital (315-325), but later re-merged in Aegyptus. In 341 the province was reconstituted, but the name was changed into Augustamnica to remove pagan connotations. It consisted of the Eastern part of the Nile delta and the ancient Heptanomia, and belonged to the Diocese of Oriens.

Augustamnica was the only Egyptian province under a corrector, a lower ranking governor.

Around 381 the provinces of Egypt become a diocese in their own, and so Augustamnica become part of the Diocese of Egypt. Between 386 and the end of the 4th century the new province of Arcadia Aegypti, named after Emperor Arcadius, was created with territory from Augustamnica, the Heptanomia; Augustamnica's capital was moved to Pelusium.

From the military point of view, the province was under the Comes limitis Aegypti. According to the Notitia dignitatum, the province hosted several military units:
Ala secunda Ulpia Afrorum at Thaubasteos
Ala secunda Aegyptiorum at Tacasiria,
Cohors prima sagittariorum at Naithu 
Cohors prima Augusta Pannoniorum at Tohu,
Cohors prima Epireorum at Castra Iudaeorum
Cohors quarta Iuthungorum at Affroditus
Cohors secunda Ituraeorum at Aiy
Cohors secunda Thracum at Muson
Cohors quarta Numidarum at Narmunthi

Augustamnica I and II 
Before 539, Augustamnica was divided into two provinces: Augustamnica Prima (First - North) and Augustamnica Secunda (Second - South).

Augustamnica Prima had Pelusium as metropolis (administrative centre) and was under a corrector, who governed the following cities: Pelusium, Setroithes (or Sethroitis), Tanis, Thmuis, Rhinocorura, Ostracine (or Ostracina), Pentaschoinon, Casium, Aphnaion, Hephaestus, Panephysis, the Tents outside Gerra, the Tents inside Gerra, Thennesus, Panephusis.

Leontopolis was the capital of Augustamnica Secunda.

Episcopal sees 
Ancient episcopal sees of Augustamnica I listed in the Annuario Pontificio as titular sees:

Ancient episcopal sees of Augustamnica II listed in the Annuario Pontificio as titular sees:

Notes

References 
 

Byzantine Egypt
Late Roman provinces
Roman Egypt